Nina Kraviz is a Russian DJ, music producer and singer.

Early life and career
Kraviz was born and raised in Irkutsk, Siberia, Russia. She moved to Moscow to study dentistry where she later gained her residency. Kraviz also worked in a number of roles in the early 2000s before her music career took off, including fixing "cosmonauts' teeth", hosting a local Irkutsk radio show, writing for a fanzine, and held a club residency on Friday nights.

In 2005, she was accepted into the Red Bull Music Academy in Seattle, however couldn't attend as she couldn't obtain a visa, attending the following year in Melbourne instead. By 2008 she was playing a regular night at the Propaganda Club in Moscow.

Kraviz released her self-titled debut album in February 2012 through the Rekids record label, to mixed-positive reviews. Kraviz started her own record label in 2014, named трип (English: Trip). She mixed the forty-eighth DJ-Kicks mix album, which was released in January 2015.

She took part in writing the music for the 2020 game Cyberpunk 2077. She also voiced her cameo in the game itself, in Russian and English versions. In 2021 Nina Kraviz, along with other artists like Ben Sims, Oscar Mulero, and Marcel Dettmann participated in PX099: 100 Years Of Colombia: a techno compilation with tracks from the artists on the scene with the intention of raising awareness about Colombia’s social unrest.

At the onset of the 2022 Russian invasion of Ukraine, Kraviz posted a video of herself writing "PEACE!" in Russian on her Instagram page.

Discography

Albums 
 Nina Kraviz (Rekids, 2012)

Remix albums 
 The Remixes (Rekids, 2012)

Extended plays 
 First Time EP (2009)
 Ghetto Kraviz (Rekids, 2011)
 Mr Jones (Rekids, 2013)
 stranno stranno. neobjatno. (trip, 2019)

DJ mixes 
 DJ-Kicks (#48) (2015)
 fabric 91 (2016)

Singles 
 "Voices" (2009)
 "Pain in the Ass" (Rekids, 2009)
 "Hotter Than July" (2009)
 "I'm Week" (Rekids, 2010)
 "Moses" (vs. Sascha Funke; 2010)
 "Zlobnii Mikrob" (2010)
 "The Loop" (2010)
 "Aus" (2012)
 "Choices" (2012)
 "Taxi Talk" (2012)
 "Let's Do It" (trip, 2015)
 "Don't Mind Wrong Keys" (trip, 2015)
 "Pochuvstvui" (trip, 2017)
 "You Take" (trip, 2017)
 "Opa" (trip, 2018)
 "Hi Josh" (trip, 2018)
 "This Time" (2021)
 "Skyscrapers" (2021)
 "Hace ejercicios" (trip, 2022)
 "Tarde" (2023)

Remixes 
 St. Vincent — "New York" (Nina Kraviz Vocal Remix) (2019)

Awards and nominations

DJ Awards

DJ Magazine's top 100 DJs

International Dance Music Awards

References

Musicians from Irkutsk
Women DJs
Russian DJs
Living people
Russian women musicians
Women in electronic music
21st-century women musicians
Russian record producers
Russian dentists
Year of birth missing (living people)